Carolina is a feminine given name in Spanish, English, Italian, Portuguese, Catalan and Swedish, derived from the masculine name Carolus which is Latin for Charles, generally meaning 'free man' or 'freeholder'.

Variations
Karolina (Polish, Slovenian, Hungarian, Swedish, Norwegian, Danish, German)
Karolína (Czech, Slovak)
Каролина (Macedonian)
Carolina (Italian, Spanish, Portuguese)
Karna (Swedish)
Καρολίνα (Greek)

Notable people
Archduchess Maria Carolina of Austria (1752–1814), Queen of Naples and Sicily
Carolina Barco (born 1951), Colombian-American diplomat
Carolina Duer (born 1978), Argentine world champion boxer
Carolina Estrada (born 1979), Spanish pianist
Carolina Falkholt, Swedish artist, graffiti writer and musician
Carolina Gaitán, Colombian television actress
Carolina Gómez (born 1974), Colombian actress, presenter and model
Carolina Gómez (cyclist) (born 1992), Argentine cyclist
Carolina Gynning, Swedish model
Carolina Granberg (1818–1884), Swedish ballerina
Carolina Maria de Jesus (1914–1977), Brazilian writer
Carolina Herrera (born 1939), Venezuelan fashion designer
Carolina Klüft, Swedish athlete
Carolina Kostner, Italian figure skater
Carolina Luzzatto (1837–1919), Italian journalist and writer
Carolina Marín, professional badminton player from Spain
Carolina Moraes (born 1980), Brazilian synchronized swimmer
Carolina Miranda (disambiguation)
Carolina Oliphant, Lady Nairne, a Scottish songwriter
Carolina Östberg, Swedish opera singer
Karolina Pelendritou (born 1986), Greek-Cypriot visually impaired swimmer
Carolina Darias San Sebastián, Spanish politician
Carolina Santo Domingo, American fashion designer
Carolina Telechea (born 1981), Catalan politician

See also

Carlina (name)
Carolena Carstens
Karolina (name)

Notes

External links 
 
 
 

Spanish feminine given names
Portuguese feminine given names
Italian feminine given names
Catalan feminine given names
English feminine given names
Swedish feminine given names